The 17th Canadian Comedy Awards, presented by the Canadian Comedy Foundation for Excellence (CCFE), honoured the best live, television, film, and Internet comedy from 1 January 2015 to 30 June 2016.

This was a transitional year which saw a reorganization of the awards.  Due to budgetary and time limitations, Canadian Comedy Awards, also known as Beavers, were awarded in only nine categories with all nominees and winners decided by public vote.  There was no festival or gala ceremony.

Trailer Park Boys led with three nominations, for their TV show, podcast, and feature.  They won Beavers for the former two categories.

Reorganization and abbreviated awards

The Canadian Comedy Awards (CCA) had been put on hold when the license expired in 2015.  When the separation process was completed in 2016, there had been insufficient time for the usual consultation with industry members in creating categories, selecting juries and nominees.  Industry-voting categories were set aside and nine categories were made available for online public voting in two rounds.  An initial round of voting from 8 to 30 September determined nominees, and a second round of voting from 3 to 16 October determined the winners.

Due to time and budgetary limitations, there was no CCA festival or awards gala for this year. Winners were announced at a nominees reception at The Second City in Toronto, Ontario, on 6 November 2016.

Winners and nominees

27,062 people voted online for winners in nine categories.

Winners are listed first and highlighted in boldface:

Footnotes

Notes

References

External links
Canadian Comedy Awards official website

Canadian Comedy Awards
Canadian Comedy Awards
Awards
Awards